Hiremath is a Hindu surname from northern and central part of Karnataka in India belonging to kannada jangam veerashaiva lingayath community. Notable people with the surname include:

 Panchakshari Hiremath (born 1933), Indian writer and poet
 R. C. Hiremath (1920–1998), Indian writer
 Satish Hiremath (born 1963), American politician
 Shirish Hiremath (born 1951), Indian cardiologist

References

Indian surnames